The National Ocean Sciences Bowl (NOSB) is a national high-school science competition managed by the Consortium for Ocean Leadership. It follows a quiz-bowl format, with lockout buzzers and extended team challenge questions to test students on their knowledge of oceanography. Questions cover the fields of biology, chemistry, geology, geography, social science, technology, and physics. The purpose of the event is to increase knowledge of the ocean among high school students and, ultimately, magnify public understanding of ocean research. 

The annual competition was first held in 1998, the International Year of the Ocean. Twenty-five U.S. regions compete in the NOSB, each with its own regional competitions. The regional competitions are coordinated by Regional Coordinators, who are typically affiliated with a university in their region. Each year, approximately 2,000 students from 300 schools across the nation compete for prizes and a trip to the national competition. Students who participate are eligible to apply for the National Ocean Scholar Program.

The NOSB is a creation of oceanographer Rick Spinrad.

Format and scoring

Types of questions
 Toss-up: These are multiple choice questions that can be answered by any of the 4 active players on either team in play. Teams have 5 seconds to buzz in and answer the question. If the first team's answer is incorrect, the opposing team will get another 5 seconds to answer. The team that buzzes in first gets to answer the question. A correct answer wins the team 4 points and the right to attempt a bonus question. No conferring is allowed on toss-ups. If a player buzzes in before a moderator finishes reading the question, the buzz is called an interrupt. An incorrect answer will cause the team to lose 4 points and the question to be re-read to the opposing team. This is the only situation in which a team can lose points. However, no points are lost for incorrect answers that are not interrupts. If a player begins an answer before being verbally recognized by the moderator, this is called a blurt. The answer is ignored (not indicated correct or incorrect by the moderator) and the question is re-read to the opposing team. There is no point penalty for a blurt, but the team that blurted is disqualified from answering that question.
 Bonus: These are short answer questions that only the team that correctly answered the previous toss-up may answer. Teams have 20 seconds to confer and answer this question. The team captain must begin the team's answer before time is called. A correct response is awarded with an additional 6 points.
 Team Challenge Question (TCQ): Each Team Challenge Question is an essay-type question worth up to 20 points, with partial credit awarded if necessary. Time ranges from 2 to 5 minutes for a challenge question, and the topics can be anything related to oceanography.

A single NOSB match consists of two 6-minute buzzer rounds with two Team Challenge Questions in between. Each round is made up of 20 questions pairs. After the break, the second half begins with the first toss-up that was not read in the first half and continues until time expires or all questions have been read. The most points a team can earn each round is 240 points (20 toss-ups and bonuses each plus full-credit on the two TCQs), but earning 100 or more points is considered very impressive. Teams may make substitutions only during the break.

With the exception of articles such as "a","an", and "the", answers to multiple-choice questions must be exactly as those on the written page. Prefacing answers with phrases such as "My answer is" is not acceptable.

Science Expert Briefing (SEB)
The SEB is a mock congressional hearing where students present science recommendations on a piece of legislation, enhancing the critical thinking elements of the competition and focusing on real-world skills. Regional bowl winners must participate in the SEB to be eligible for the national finals.

Roles of officials
 Moderator: Reads questions and interprets responses by comparing with the answer sheet.
 Science Judge: If the official answer is challenged by a team, the moderator may consult the Science Judge to come to a verdict.
 Rules Judge: Oversees activity in the event room and addresses any issues or misbehavior.
 Scorekeeper: Records the current score of a progressing match, including rewards and penalties. Generally a copy is saved for later reference.
 Timekeeper: Tracks the time throughout the round. In charge of stopping, starting, and resetting the clock. Also notifies teams of time benchmarks (such as 5 seconds left to answer a bonus or 45 and 15 seconds left to answer a Team Challenge Question).
 Runner: Primarily used for retrieving documents, such as the official testing material. Also brings Team Challenge Questions to and from the grading center for official scoring.

Locations
The National competition is held in one of the participating colleges that hold the regional bowls. These colleges draw from high schools in their area and run the regional competitions, often naming the regional according to the characteristics of the region. For example, the region encompassing Colorado and the surrounding area is called the "Trout Bowl." The annual themes, since 2008, are also listed below.

Nationals
 2021- Virtual - Plunging into Our Polar Seas
 2020- Virtual - Understanding Human, Economic and Environmental Resiliency in the Gulf of Mexico
 2019- Washington, DC - Observe the Ocean, Secure the Future
 2018- Boulder, Colorado - Our Ocean Shaping Weather
 2017- Corvallis, Oregon - Blue Energy: Powering the Planet With Our Ocean
 2016- Morehead City, North Carolina - Our Changing Ocean: Science for Strong Coastal Communities
 2015- Ocean Springs, Mississippi - The Science of Oil in the Ocean
 2014- Seattle, Washington - Ocean Acidification
 2013- Milwaukee, Wisconsin - The Great Lakes: A Window into Freshwater Science
 2012- Baltimore, Maryland - Sea of Change: Development and Evolution
 2011- Galveston, Texas - Human Responses to Ocean Events
 2010- St. Petersburg, Florida - Marine Technology
 2009- Washington, DC - Biodiversity
 2008- Seward, Alaska - International Polar Year
 2007- Long Island, New York
 2006- Pacific Grove, California
 2005- Biloxi, Mississippi
 2004- Charleston, South Carolina
 2003- LaJolla, California
 2002- Providence, Rhode Island
 2001- Miami, Florida
 2000- Linthicum, Maryland
 1999- Washington, DC
 1998- Washington, DC

Regionals
Aloha Bowl (University of Hawaiʻi at Mānoa)
 Bay Scallop Bowl (Stony Brook University)
Blue Crab Bowl (Virginia Institute of Marine Science)
Blue Heron Bowl (University of North Carolina Institute of Marine Sciences and Seahorse Coastal Consulting)
Blue Lobster Bowl (MIT Sea Grant College Program)
 Chesapeake Bay Bowl (George Mason University)
be Dolphin Challenge (Texas A&M University - Galveston)
Garibaldi Bowl (University of San Diego) (formerly Grunion Bowl)
Great Lakes Bowl (University of Michigan)
Hurricane Bowl (Gulf Coast Research Laboratory Marine Education Center)
Lake Sturgeon Bowl (University of Wisconsin–Milwaukee)
Loggerhead Challenge (University of Texas Marine Science Institute - Port Aransas)
Los Angeles Surf Bowl (Jet Propulsion Laboratory)
Manatee Bowl (Florida Atlantic University: Harbor Branch Oceanographic Institute)
Nor'easter Bowl (University of New England)
Orca Bowl (University of Washington)
Penguin Bowl (Pittsburgh Zoo & PPG Aquarium)
Quahog Bowl (Connecticut Sea Grant & Project Oceanology)
Salmon Bowl (Oregon State University)
Sea Lion Bowl (California State University, Monterey Bay) (formerly Otter Bowl)
Shore Bowl (Rutgers University)
Southern Stingray Bowl (Savannah State University)
Spoonbill Bowl (University of South Florida)
Trout Bowl (University of Colorado)
Tsunami Bowl (University of Alaska-Fairbanks)

Results of the national competition
Schools with greatest number of wins
 5: Lexington High School (1998-2002)
 4: Marshfield High School (2009-2012)
 2: Albany High School (2016, 2019)
 2: Boise High School (2014-2015)
 2: Lincoln-Sudbury Regional High School (2006, 2008)
 2: Cranston High School West (Cranston, Rhode Island) (2003, 2005)
 1: Dougherty Valley High School (2021)
 1: Ladue Horton Watkins High School (2020)
 1: Montgomery Blair High School (2018)
 1: Santa Monica High School (2017)
 1: Arcadia High School (2013)
 1: Contoocook Valley Regional High School (2007)
 1: Mission San Jose High School (2004)

Top-placing teams at the 2021 National Ocean Sciences Bowl (the second year of virtual competition): 
 Dougherty Valley High School
 Lexington High School
 Canyon Crest Academy 
 Santa Monica High School
 Tesla STEM High School
 Saline High School
 Oxford High School
 E. O. Smith High School 

Top-placing teams at the 2020 National Ocean Sciences Bowl (the 2020 competition was the first-ever virtual finals competition):
 Ladue Horton Watkins High School
 Santa Monica High School
 Dougherty Valley High School
 Centerville High School
 West Windsor-Plainsboro High School North
 Newport High School
 Lexington High School
 Arkansas School for Mathematics, Sciences, and the Arts

Top-placing teams at the 2019 National Ocean Sciences Bowl: 
 Albany High School
 Santa Monica High School
 Ladue Horton Watkins High School
 Centerville High School
 Marine Academy of Science and Technology
 Oregon Coast Aquarium (Newport, Oregon) 
 Newport High School
 Science and Technology Magnet High School of Southeastern Connecticut

Top-placing teams at the 2018 National Ocean Sciences Bowl: 
 Montgomery Blair High School
 Santa Monica High School
 Marshfield High School
 Albany High School
 Newport High School
 Fort Collins High School
 Princeton High School (New Jersey)
 Mount Sinai High School

Top-placing teams at the 2017 National Ocean Sciences Bowl:
 Santa Monica High School
 Marshfield High School
 North Carolina School of Science and Math
 Centerville High School
 Bishop Sullivan Catholic High School
 Eastside High School
 Liberty Common High School
 Oxford High School
Kalani High School won the sportsmanship award.

Top-placing teams at the 2016 National Ocean Sciences Bowl:
 Albany High School
 Marshfield High School
 Santa Monica High School
 Liberty Common High School
 Boise High School
 Lexington High School
 E. O. Smith High School
 Montgomery Blair High School
York High School won the sportsmanship award.

Top-placing teams at the 2015 National Ocean Sciences Bowl:
 Boise High School
 Dexter High School
 Marshfield High School
 Mission San Jose High School
 Mount Sinai High School
 Lexington High School
 Chaparral Star Academy
 Arcadia High School
Sanger High School won the sportsmanship award.

Top-placing teams at the 2014 National Ocean Sciences Bowl:
 Boise High School
 Arcadia High School
 Juneau-Douglas High School
 Bishop Sullivan Catholic High School
 Eastside High School
 Chaparral Star Academy
 Thomas Jefferson High School for Science and Technology
 Lexington High School
Langham Creek High School won the sportsmanship award.

Top-placing teams at the 2013 National Ocean Sciences Bowl:
 Arcadia High School
 Lexington High School
 Juneau-Douglas High School
 Neah-Kah-Nie High School
 Albany High School
 Greenhills High School
 Dana Hills High School
 Maui High School
Annapolis Christian Academy won the sportsmanship award.

Top-placing teams at the 2012 National Ocean Sciences Bowl:
 Marshfield High School
 Raleigh Charter High School 
 Eastside High School
 Lexington High School
 Santa Monica High School
 Maui High School
 Albany High School
 Loveland High School

Top-placing teams at the 2011 National Ocean Sciences Bowl:
 Marshfield High School
 Lexington High School
 Santa Monica High School
 Mt. Sinai High School
 Contoocook Valley Regional High School
 Mission San Jose High School
 State College High School
 North Carolina School of Science and Mathematics

Top-placing teams at the 2010 National Ocean Sciences Bowl:
 Marshfield High School
 Marine Academy of Science and Technology
 Mission San Jose High School
 La Jolla High School
 Punahou School
 Neah-Kah-Nie High School
 Thomas Jefferson High School for Science and Technology
 Arcadia High School
 Mount Sinai High School
Langham Creek High School won the sportsmanship award.

Top-placing teams at the 2009 National Ocean Sciences Bowl:
 Marshfield High School
 Lexington High School
 Cranston High School West
 Mission San Jose High School
 Raleigh Charter High School

Top-placing teams at the 2008 National Ocean Sciences Bowl:
 Lincoln-Sudbury Regional High School
 Mission San Jose High School
 Santa Monica High School
 Dexter High School
 La Jolla High School
Kealakehe High School won the sportsmanship award.

Top-placing teams at the 2007 National Ocean Sciences Bowl:
 Contoocook Valley Regional High School (Peterborough, New Hampshire)
 Cranston High School West (Cranston, Rhode Island)
 Lincoln-Sudbury Regional High School (Sudbury, Massachusetts)
 Santa Monica High School (Santa Monica, CA)
 Smoky Hill High School (Aurora, CO)
 Churchville-Chili High School (Churchville, New York)
 Dexter High School (Dexter, MI)
 Durant High School (Plant City, FL)

Poplarville High School won the sportsmanship award.

Top-placing teams at the 2006 National Ocean Sciences Bowl:
 Lincoln-Sudbury Regional High School (Sudbury, Massachusetts)
 Poudre High School (Fort Collins, CO)
 Santa Monica High School (Santa Monica, CA)
 Albany High School (Albany, CA)
 MAST Academy (Miami, FL)
 Oconee County High School (Oconee County, Georgia)
 Langham Creek High School (Langham Creek, TX)
 Thomas Jefferson High School for Science and Technology (Arlington, VA)

Top-placing teams at the 2005 National Ocean Sciences Bowl:
 Cranston High School West (Cranston, Rhode Island)
 Lincoln-Sudbury Regional High School (Sudbury, Massachusetts)
 Mission San Jose High School (Fremont, California)
 Oconee County High School (Oconee County, Georgia)
 La Jolla High School (La Jolla, California)
 Maui High School (Maui County, Hawaii)
 Santa Monica High School (Santa Monica, California)
 Incarnate Word Academy (Corpus Christi, Texas)

Past National Ocean Sciences Bowl Winners:
 2004 - Mission San Jose High School (Fremont, California)
 2003 - Cranston High School West (Cranston, Rhode Island)
 2002 - Lexington High School, (Lexington, MA)
 2001 - Lexington High School, (Lexington, MA)
 2000 - Lexington High School, (Lexington, MA)
 1999 - Lexington High School, (Lexington, MA)
 1998 - Lexington High School, (Lexington, MA)

Prizes
The prizes for placing at the national competition vary from year to year. In recent years, the top two teams have received week-long experiential trips while many of the other teams at the national competition have received smaller prizes.

2016
 1st: Monaco (Courtesy of Prince Albert II of Monaco Foundation)
 2nd: University of Milwaukee, Wisconsin, School of Freshwater Sciences

2015
 1st: NOAA Auke Bay Laboratory, Juneau, Alaska, and Sitka Sound Science Center, Sitka, Alaska
 2nd: University of Texas Marine Science Institute, Port Aransas, Texas, and Harte Research Institute for Gulf of Mexico Studies, Corpus Christi, Texas
2014
 1st: Shoals Marine Lab, Portsmouth, New Hampshire, University of Maine Darling Marine Center, Walpole, Maine, Bigelow Laboratory for Ocean Sciences, East Boothbay, Maine, and Gulf of Maine Research Institute, Portland, Maine
 2nd: Smithsonian, Washington DC, NOAA Oxford Laboratory, Oxford, Maryland, Khaled bin Sultan Living Oceans Foundation, Annapolis, Maryland
2013
 1st: University of Massachusetts Dartmouth, North Dartmouth, Massachusetts, Hoods Hole Oceanographic Institute, Falmouth, Massachusetts, University of Rhode Island, South Kingston, Rhode Island, and Connecticut Sea Grant, Groton, Connecticut
 2nd: University of Georgia Marine Extension Service, Savannah, Georgia, Skidaway Institute of Oceanography, Savannah, Georgia, and Savannah State University, Savannah, Georgia

See also
 Science Bowl

External links
 Official NOSB website
 Consortium for Ocean Leadership

References

Science competitions
Student quiz competitions
Science events in the United States